Kishe Khaleh (also Romanized as Kīshe Khāleh) is a village in Masal Rural District, Masal District, Masal County, Gilan Province, Iran. At the 2006 census, its population was 224, in 56 families.

References 

Populated places in Masal County